Kim Myong-sik (born 30 June 1969) is a North Korean weightlifter. He competed in the men's flyweight event at the 1992 Summer Olympics.

References

1969 births
Living people
North Korean male weightlifters
Olympic weightlifters of North Korea
Weightlifters at the 1992 Summer Olympics
Place of birth missing (living people)
Asian Games medalists in weightlifting
Weightlifters at the 1990 Asian Games
Asian Games bronze medalists for North Korea
Medalists at the 1990 Asian Games
20th-century North Korean people
21st-century North Korean people